Estadio Inca Garcilaso de la Vega, commonly known as Estadio Garcilaso, is Cusco's principal stadium and the home venue of the local football team Cienciano. The stadium was named after the Peruvian mestizo Inca Garcilaso de la Vega and inaugurated in 1958, with an initial capacity of 30,000. It is owned by the Instituto Peruano del Deporte (Peruvian Institute of Sport).

The increase in spectator capacity came after CONMEBOL chose Peru to host the Copa América 2004, prompting the Peruvian government to invest in a five-million dollar renovation program for its stadia, including the Estadio Garcilaso de la Vega. Its renovation cost approximately $1,720,000, which helped boost its official spectator capacity to 42,056. The stadium ended up hosting the third place game of the Copa América 2004. Thanks to the event, the city of Cusco received even more tourists than it already receives as Peru's top tourist destination.

The Estadio Garcilaso de la Vega is also recognized as one of the most beautiful stadiums in all of South America. This recognition is due to its well-maintained grass and its resistance to the sometimes aggressive and highly variable climate of the city of Cuzco. The awe is the stadium's perpetual beauty even after these climates. It is this resistive beauty that inspires soccer commentators and visitors alike.
Estadio Garcilaso will be given another renovation where its capacity will increase to 44,000, have sun shades over its spectator seats, and have the supports covered. The project would cost 52 million soles. 

The stadium is currently home to three football clubs. The first two original clubs since the 1950s are Cienciano of the Peruvian Primera Division and Deportivo Garcilaso of the Copa Perú, and the third is Cusco FC, also of the Peruvian Primera División.

See also
 Peru national football team
 List of Peruvian stadiums

References

External links
 Peruvian Soccer Federation (in Spanish)

Football venues in Peru
Estadio Garcilaso
Copa América stadiums
Sports venues completed in 1950
Estadio Garcilaso
Deportivo Garcilaso